Diemer True (born February 12, 1946) was an American politician in the state of Wyoming. He served in the Wyoming House of Representatives and Wyoming State Senate as a member of the Republican Party.

He attended Northwestern University. True served as President of the Wyoming Senate from 1991 to 1993.

True also served in a variety of roles in the Wyoming State Republican Party, including state chairman and national committeeman.  He was chairman of the Independent Petroleum Association of America (IPAA) from 2001 to 2003,  and was recognized with the annual Chief Roughneck award for career contribution to the domestic energy industry in 2008.

References

1946 births
Living people
People from Cody, Wyoming
Northwestern University alumni
Presidents of the Wyoming Senate
Republican Party Wyoming state senators
Republican Party members of the Wyoming House of Representatives